Vijaya-chandra (IAST: Vijayacandra, r. c. 1155-1169 CE) was an Indian king from the Gahadavala dynasty. He ruled the Antarvedi country in the Gangetic plains, which includes a major part of the present-day eastern Uttar Pradesh, including Varanasi. He probably also ruled some parts of western Bihar through his feudatories. He is believed to have repulsed a Ghaznavid invasion.

Early life 

Vijayachandra was a son of Govindachandra, the most powerful king of the dynasty. He is also known as Vijayapala or Malladeva. The last extant inscription of Govindachandra is dated 1154 CE. The earliest extant inscription of Vijayachandra is dated 1168 CE. His last inscription is from 1169 CE, while the first inscription of his successor Jayachandra is from 1170 CE. As Govindachandra had already ruled for 40 years by 1154 CE, it can be assumed that his reign ended shortly after 1154 CE. Vijayachandra must have ascended the throne around 1155 CE, and ruled for approximately 15 years.

Besides Vijayachandra, Govindachandra had at least two other sons: Asphota-chandra and Rajya-pala. Asphotachandra bore the title Yuvaraja (heir apparent), as attested by an 1134 CE inscription. Rajyapala bore the title Maharajaputra (prince), as attested by the 1143 CE Gagaha inscription and the 1146 CE Varanasi inscription. It is not known why Vijayachandra ascended the throne when Asphotachandra was the yuvaraja. It is possible that the other two princes died during Govindachandra's lifetime, or that Govindachandra defeated them in a war of succession, but there is no concrete evidence for either of these hypotheses.

The absence of any Gahadavala inscription between 1154 CE and 1169 CE is rather unusual for the dynasty. It may have been a result of the troubled times brought about by external invasions, or a war of succession among Govindachandra's sons.

Vijayachandra inherited his father's regnal titles Ashva-pati Nara-pati Gaja-pati Rajatrayadhipati and Vividha-vidya-vichara-vachaspati.

Military career 

{
	"type": "FeatureCollection",
	"features": [
		{
			"type": "Feature",
			"properties": { "marker-symbol": "monument", "marker-color": "000080", "title": "Kamauli" },
			"geometry": { "type": "Point", "coordinates": [83.0669, 25.3478] }
		},
		{
			"type": "Feature",
			"properties": { "marker-symbol": "monument", "marker-color": "808080", "title": "Tutrahi waterfall", "comment": "TODO: Need exact coordinates, the current coords are for Tilouthu near Tutrahi" },
			"geometry": { "type": "Point", "coordinates": [84.0599, 24.8297] }
		},
		{
			"type": "Feature",
			"properties": { "marker-symbol": "monument", "marker-color": "808080", "title": "Tara Chandi" },
			"geometry": { "type": "Point", "coordinates": [84.0475, 24.9214] }
		},
		{
			"type": "Feature",
			"properties": { "marker-symbol": "monument", "marker-color": "808080", "title": "Phulwaria" },
			"geometry": { "type": "Point", "coordinates": [83.8376, 24.9821] }
		},
		{
			"type": "Feature",
			"properties": { "marker-symbol": "monument", "marker-color": "000080", "title": "Lal Darwaza Masjid, Jaunpur" },
			"geometry": { "type": "Point", "coordinates": [82.6711, 25.7699] }
		}
	]
}

The 1169 CE Tara Chandi rock inscription, found near Sasaram, was issued by one Mahanayaka Pratapadhavala of Japila. It denounces an earlier fake grant of Kalahandi and Vadapila villages issued by Vijayachandra's officer Deu after taking a bribe. Historian Roma Niyogi theorized that Pratapadhavala was a feudatory of Vijayachandra. According to her, since there is no record of this region being a part of Govindachandra's kingdom, Vijayachandra may have captured it.

Ghaznavids 

The Gahadavala inscriptions praise Vijayachandra using vague, conventional terms. According to them, the king swept away the world's suffering with tears from the eyes of Hammira's wife. "Hammira" (the Sanskritized form of Amir) refers to a Muslim general, possibly a subordinate of a Ghaznavid ruler. The Ghaznavid ruler could have been either Khusrau Shah or Khusrau Malik. The Ghaznavids had permanently lost Ghazna by their time, and were operating out of Lahore. Their attempts to expand eastwards may have brought them into conflicts with the Gahadavalas. The earliest extant inscription to mention this victory is from 1168 CE, so the battle definitely took place before this year. The Chahamana king Vigraharaja IV had captured Delhi by 1164 CE, and is believed to have expelled the Turushkas (Turkic people, that is, Ghaznavids). Therefore, the battle can probably be dated before 1164 CE.

While fighting with the Ghaznavids, Vijayachandra may have ignored his western frontiers. This later resulted in a Sena invasion led by Lakshmana Sena.

Description in Prithviraj Raso 

The historically unreliable Prithviraj Raso claims that Vijayachandra defeated Anangapala of Delhi. There is a possibility that Vijayachandra fought with Anangapala, the Tomara ruler of Delhi. However, there is no other authentic evidence to corroborate this claim. By 1164 CE, Delhi had been captured by the Chahamana king Vigraharaja IV.

The text further claims that he defeated the Bhola-Bhima of Pattanapura, that is, Bhima II of Patan. However, Bhima II of the Chaulukya dynasty ascended the throne only in 1177 CE, after Vijayachandra's death. Therefore, this claim is not accurate.

The text also claims that Vijayachandra defeated Mukunda-deva, the Somavanshi king of Kataka. Mukunda was forced to conclude peace by marrying his daughter to prince Jayachandra; Samyukta was the issue of this marriage. This claim is also wrong, as the Somavanshi dynasty did not have any king named Mukunda-deva. Moreover, the Somavanshis had already been displaced by the Gangas before Vijayachandra's ascension.

Inscriptions 

The following inscriptions from Vijayachandra's reign have been discovered:

Cultural activities 

Vijayachandra patronized scholars and poets, including Shriharsha, who composed a now-lost work called Shri-Vijaya-Prashasti. This text may have been a eulogistic biography of Vijayachandra. An inscription of Jayachandra states that reputed poets used to sing about his father's magnificence, which might be a reference to such eulogistic works.

References

Bibliography 

 
 
 

Gahadavala dynasty
12th-century Indian monarchs